Sangin Deh (also Romanized as Sangīn Deh) is a village in Natel-e Restaq Rural District, Chamestan District, Nur County, Mazandaran Province, Iran. At the 2006 census, its population was 139, in 37 families.

References 

Populated places in Nur County